All Out!! (stylized as ALL OUT!!) is a Japanese manga series written by Shiori Amase. It was serialized in Kodansha's seinen manga magazine Monthly Morning Two from November 2012 to February 2020, with its chapter collected in seventeen tankōbon volumes. An anime television series adaptation by Madhouse and TMS Entertainment aired from October 2016 to March 2017.

Characters

Kanagawa Prefectural High School Rugby Club

Media

Manga
The original manga by Shiori Amase has been serialized in Kodansha's Monthly Morning Two magazine from November 21, 2012 to February 21, 2020. Seventeen tankōbon volumes have been released so far. Kodansha Comics have announced that they will release the manga in English in a digital-only format.

Volume list

Anime
An anime television series adaptation aired from October 7 2016 to March 31, 2017. The series is produced by Madhouse and TMS Entertainment, with Telecom Animation Film assisting with the production. The anime is directed by Kenichi Shimizu, and written by Masahiro Yokotani and Shingo Irie, with character designs by Masanori Shino and music by Yasuharu Takanashi. Toshiyuki Koudate and Masaki Hayashi are producing the series. The series is also available on Italian VVVVID, undubbed and subtitled.

Episode list

Other media
A drama CD adaptation was bundled with the limited edition of the eighth volume and the reprint of the first volume of the manga, released on February 23, 2016.

Stage plays
A stage play adaptation of All Out!! was announced on December 22, 2016, with Shatner Nishida as director and scriptwriter. The stage play ran from May 2017 at Zepp Blue Theater Roppongi Tokyo. The casts include Motohisa Harashima, Yu Imari, Daichi Saeki, and Masaya Matsukaze.

Notes

References

External links
  
  
 

Anime series based on manga
Funimation
Kodansha manga
Madhouse (company)
Mainichi Broadcasting System original programming
Manga adapted into television series
Rugby in anime and manga
Seinen manga
TMS Entertainment
Tokyo MX original programming